Eric John Bristow,  (25 April 1957 – 5 April 2018), nicknamed "The Crafty Cockney", was an English professional darts player.

He was ranked World No. 1 by the World Darts Federation a record five times, in 1980, 1981 and 1983–1985. He was a five-time World Champion, a five-time World Masters Champion a four-time World Cup singles champion and 2-time champion of the News of the World Darts Championship. He won 22 WDF and BDO Major titles, he won 62 individual career titles, added to 20 titles in team events, winning 82 overall. In the 1980s, Bristow's skill and personality helped turn darts into a worldwide spectator sport.

In 1993, Bristow was one of sixteen top players who broke away from the British Darts Organisation (BDO) to form their own organisation, which became the Professional Darts Corporation (PDC).

He retired from competitive darts in 2007 and subsequently worked as a commentator and pundit on Sky Sports darts coverage.

Early career 
In 1957, Bristow was born in the London Borough of Hackney, where his father was a plasterer and his mother worked as a telephone operator. Bristow left school at age 14.  Bristow won his first world championship in 1980, defeating fellow Londoner Bobby George (regarded as the match that changed darts forever) so beginning almost a decade of domination, retaining his title in 1981 and winning it again in 1984, 1985 and 1986. Like his snooker contemporary Steve Davis, however, he also had to cope with a shock defeat in a final during this period, when young unknown Keith Deller beat him in the 1983 final; he had also lost to Steve Brennan in the previous year's first round. As well as his five world titles, Bristow also finished as runner-up on five occasions, the last in 1991.

The nickname Crafty Cockney was given to Bristow when he visited an English pub of that name in 1976 during a visit to Santa Monica, California. Bristow wore a shirt (which he received from the same pub) depicting a uniformed British policeman, a Union Flag and the title Crafty Cockney whenever he took part in a tournament.

Achievements 
Bristow emerged as the most successful and consistent darts player of the 1980s, reigning as number one in the world rankings most of the time from 1980 until 1987. He was fortunate to have been around at the right time as television began showing increased interest in the sport in the late 1970s, with the first world championship occurring in 1978. This, allied to the fact that a governing body had been formed in January 1973 and that Bristow had not only supreme talent for one so young but an imposing personality and uncontained self belief, enabled him to make a very successful living. Cocky and arrogant, he invariably wound opponents up before and during matches with his gamesmanship. Crowds would boo Bristow when he was on stage, no less so than in Scotland, an atmosphere in which he revelled.

During the 1982 Arrows Chemicals British International Championship match in Scotland, Bristow was subject to what Darts World Magazine called "the most sustained barrage of jeering witnessed at a Darts match". He played to the crowd during his game with Harry Patterson; following a treble 20, he turned to the crowd only to be greeted with boos; his next dart was a treble 20, after which he turned to the crowd who met him with even more boos and jeers; lastly, his third dart was only a single 20, but the crowd applauded and Bristow merely grinned it off.

As well as his world championship exploits, Bristow also lifted the prestigious Winmau World Masters crown no fewer than five times (1977 beating Paul Reynolds, 1979 beating Canadian Allan Hogg, 1981 beating defending champion John Lowe, 1983 beating Mike Gregory and 1984 beating Keith Deller). He also reached the final in 1989, losing to Peter Evison.  He was a winner of the World Cup Singles on four occasions (1983 beating Jocky Wilson, 1985 beating Tony Payne, 1987 beating Bob Sinnaeve and 1989 beating Jack McKenna) and won the News of the World Darts Championship in 1983 beating Ralph Flatt and 1984 beating Ian Robertson (becoming only the second man in 57 years to successfully defend that title) together with countless other major tournaments including the British Open and Swedish Open three times each and the North American Open on four occasions.

Dartitis
During the Swedish Open in November 1986, Bristow found himself unable to let go of his darts properly – a psychological condition known as dartitis, similar to the yips in golf. He was never the same player again, but did regain the number-one ranking briefly in late 1989 and early 1990 before losing his form again. He had a last hurrah at the highest level of professional darts when reaching the semi finals of the 1997 WDC World Darts Championship at the Circus Tavern, where he narrowly lost to Phil Taylor 4–5 in sets.

Mentoring Phil Taylor
In the 1980s, Bristow came across Phil Taylor, then a raw young darts talent in Stoke-on-Trent. He sponsored him with about £10,000 to fund his development in the game, on the understanding that the money would be repaid. Taylor went on to usurp his mentor as the greatest darts player ever, with Bristow often on the receiving end of his brilliance.

Later career and retirement

Bristow's form deteriorated in the early 1990s and he was dropped from the Merseyside team in 1992. Bristow had joined Merseyside, his third county, in 1988, after previously playing for London from 1976–1980 and for Staffordshire from 1980–1988. With Merseyside, Bristow played with his international teammate Kevin Kenny, and after being dropped by Merseyside, he was dropped from the England national side later the same year. The split within darts saw Bristow become a founding member of the Professional Darts Corporation. At the World Matchplay event in Blackpool, Bristow made six appearances without winning a match. His swansong came in a classic semi-final at the 1997 PDC World Championship, which he lost to his protégé, Phil Taylor. Bristow's last appearance came at the World Championships in 2000, ending his 23-year run of playing in a world championship. He stopped playing professionally after the event.

From late December 1993, until November 2016, when he was sacked, he worked mainly as a spotter, a pundit and an occasional commentator for Sky Sports during televised PDC tournaments, while continuing to travel and play on the exhibition circuit. Bristow returned to TV screens as a player in 2008 on Setanta Sports to compete in the BetFred League of Legends tournament, beating Bobby George 7–5 in the opening match. Bristow failed to maintain his form, however, and did not win another match in the tournament, failing to qualify for the semi-finals and finishing bottom of the League of Legends table. In 2004, Bristow played John Lowe, with Bristow showing glimpses of his old form in winning the match 6 legs to 1.

On 29 November 2016, Bristow was sacked by Sky Sports following a series of tweets in which he responded to the United Kingdom football sexual abuse scandal centred around the football coach and convicted child sex offender, Barry Bennell. Bristow suggested the victims should have "sorted out" the perpetrators when they were older. According to him, "Dart players tough guys footballers wimps". Bristow was condemned by social media users, including alleged victims of Bennell, for his comments. Bristow apologised for his comments the following day. In a statement, he compared himself to a "bull in a China shop" and "appreciated my wording was wrong and offended many people".

Personal life

Bristow was educated at Hackney Downs Grammar School from 1968 to 1971, having passed his eleven-plus exam. He left grammar school at the age of 14.

From 1978 to 1987, Bristow was in a relationship with former darts player Maureen Flowers. In 1989, he married Jane Higginbotham (born 1962). They had two children, a daughter and a son. They divorced in 2005 after 16 years of marriage, and he was later in a relationship with Rebecca Gadd until his death.

In 1979, Bristow was the subject of a film directed by Scottish filmmaker John Samson entitled “Arrows.” The 30-minute short got its cinema release as the supporting feature for the 1980 British gangster film The Long Good Friday. He also played himself in 2002 film Heartlands.

Bristow was awarded the MBE in 1989 for his services to sport.

In 2005, Bristow was accused of assaulting his wife. North Staffordshire magistrates ordered him to stay away from the family home in Milltown Way, Leek, Staffordshire and he was remanded on conditional bail. Bristow was alleged to have punched her in the face during a drunken row in their bedroom on 29 April 2005. He was subsequently cleared of the charges.

In 2012, Bristow participated in the reality show I'm a Celebrity...Get Me Out of Here! He was voted out on 29 November 2012, finishing fourth out of 12 celebrities.

Bristow's father, George, was a big Arsenal supporter, and was an Arsenal season ticket holder for most of his life. George and Eric would go together to almost every Arsenal game, home and away, in the 1960s and the first half of the 1970s. A rare exception to this was Arsenal's 1971 FA Cup Final against Liverpool at Wembley Stadium, a final in which George had a ticket, while Eric watched on television. 
Despite Eric going to almost every Arsenal game with his dad for around a decade, Eric became a supporter of Chelsea from the late 1960s until the end of his life, and he went to some Chelsea games on his own at Stamford Bridge in the early and mid 1970s. Eric shared his father's negative opinions of London rivals Tottenham Hotspur.

Death

Bristow died on 5 April 2018, after a heart attack while attending a Premier League Darts event at the Echo Arena in Liverpool. Bristow had finished playing some VIPs at a promotional event and was walking back to his car, when he collapsed and was rushed to hospital. Bristow's death was announced during the match between Peter Wright and Daryl Gurney. The crowd paid tribute to Bristow. Speaking to BBC Radio Two, Bobby George said: "In the afternoon, I was doing a show at a pub opposite the Premier League (darts) building, and he just came in, said 'hello' and had a pint, then said 'see ya', I said 'see ya' because I was working... he went across the road, and two-and-a-half hours later, he was gone.

World Championship results

BDO

1978: 1st Round (lost to Conrad Daniels 3–6 legs)
1979: Quarter Finals (lost to Alan Evans 1–3 sets)
1980: Winner (beat Bobby George 5–3)
1981: Winner (beat John Lowe 5–3)
1982: 1st Round (lost to Steve Brennan 0–2)
1983: Runner Up (lost to Keith Deller 5–6)
1984: Winner (beat Dave Whitcombe 7–1)
1985: Winner (beat John Lowe 6–2)
1986: Winner (beat Dave Whitcombe 6–0)
1987: Runner Up (lost to John Lowe 4–6)
1988: Semi Finals (lost to John Lowe 2–5)
1989: Runner Up (lost to Jocky Wilson 4–6)
1990: Runner Up (lost to Phil Taylor 1–6)
1991: Runner Up (lost to Dennis Priestley 0–6)
1992: 2nd Round (lost to Martin Phillips 2–3)
1993: 2nd Round (lost to Bob Anderson 0–3)

PDC

1994: Group Stage (lost to Rod Harrington 1–3 & beat Sean Downs 3–2)
1995: Group Stage (lost to Rod Harrington 0–3 & lost to Shayne Burgess 0–3)
1996: Group Stage (lost to Dennis Priestley 0–3 & beat Richie Gardner 3–2)
1997: Semi Finals (lost to Phil Taylor 4–5 & lost 3rd Place Match to Peter Evison 2–4)
1998: Group Stage (lost to Dennis Priestley 0–3 & lost to Steve Raw 0–3)
1999: 1st Round (lost to Peter Manley 0–3)
2000: 1st Round (lost to Steve Brown 2–3)

Career finals

BDO and WDF major finals: 31 (22 wins, 9 runners-up)

WDF major finals: 6 (4 titles, 2 runner-up)

Independent major finals: 2 (2 titles)

Note

Performance timeline

High averages

References

External links
Eric Bristow's profile and stats on Darts Database
Arrows – A John Samson documentary about Eric Bristow (1979)
Eric Bristow at the British Film Institute

1957 births
2018 deaths
British Darts Organisation players
Darts people
Darts players with dartitis
English darts players
Members of the Order of the British Empire
People educated at Hackney Downs School
People from Hackney Central
Sportspeople from Leek, Staffordshire
People from Stoke Newington
Professional Darts Corporation founding players
BDO world darts champions
I'm a Celebrity...Get Me Out of Here! (British TV series) participants
Professional Darts Corporation Hall of Fame